Yury Nikolaevich Suslin (born 19 May 1935) is a retired Russian rower who specialised in the eights. In this event he won two silver medals at the European championships of 1963–1964 and finished fifth at the 1964 Summer Olympics. Suslin competed at the 1961 European Rowing Championships with the coxed four and won silver.

His younger brother Viktor is also a retired Olympic rower.

References

1935 births
Living people
Russian male rowers
Olympic rowers of the Soviet Union
Rowers at the 1964 Summer Olympics
Soviet male rowers
European Rowing Championships medalists